Oju  is a local government area in Benue State, Nigeria.

Climate

 In Oju, the rainy season is usually warm, oppressive, and darken and the dry season is hot, moist, and slightly cloudy. Over the course of the year, the temperature usually varies from 63 °F to 89 °F and is seldom below 57 °F or above 93 °F.

References

Local Government Areas in Benue State